Miranda Fricker, FBA FAAS (born 12 March 1966) is a British philosopher who is Professor of Philosophy at New York University, Co-Director of the New York Institute of Philosophy, and Honorary Professor at the University of Sheffield. Fricker coined the term epistemic injustice, the concept of an injustice done against someone "specifically in their capacity as a knower", and explored the concept in her 2007 book Epistemic Injustice.

Education and career

Fricker received her D.Phil. from Oxford University in 1996.  She taught at Birkbeck College, London, the University of Sheffield, The Graduate Center, CUNY and moved to New York University in 2022.  

She was elected a Fellow of the British Academy in 2016 and a Fellow of the American Academy of Arts and Sciences in 2020.

Selected publications

Books 
 The Cambridge Companion to Feminism in Philosophy, co-edited with Jennifer Hornsby (Cambridge University Press, 2000)
Epistemic Injustice: Power and the Ethics of Knowing (Oxford University Press, 2007)
 Reading Ethics: Selected Texts with Interactive Commentary, co-authored with Samuel Guttenplan (Wiley-Blackwell, 2009)
The Epistemic Life of Groups: Essays in the Epistemology of Collectives, eds. Brady & Fricker (Oxford University Press, 2016)
 Routledge Handbook of Social Epistemology, eds. Fricker, Graham, Henderson & Pedersen (Routledge, 2019)

Selected articles 
 "Powerlessness and Social Interpretation", Episteme: A Journal of Social Epistemology Vol. 3 Issue 1-2 (2006); 96-108
 "Epistemic Injustice and A Role for Virtue in the Politics of Knowing", Metaphilosophy vol. 34 Nos. 1/2 Jan 2003; reprinted in M. Brady and D. Pritchard eds. Moral and Epistemic Virtues (Blackwell, 2003)
 "Life-Story in Beauvoir's Memoirs", The Cambridge Companion to Simone de Beauvoir ed. Claudia Card (CUP, 2003)
 "Confidence and Irony", Morality, Reflection, and Ideology ed. Edward Harcourt (OUP, 2000)
 "Pluralism Without Postmodernism", The Cambridge Companion to Feminism in Philosophy eds. M. Fricker and J. Hornsby (CUP, 2000)

References

External links 
Homepage at The City of New York University (CUNY)  Graduate Center website
Homepage at The University of Sheffield School of Philosophy website

Homepage at MirandaFricker.com

20th-century British philosophers
21st-century British philosophers
Academics of Birkbeck, University of London
Alumni of the University of Oxford
English philosophers
British women philosophers
Feminist philosophers
Living people
1966 births
Fellows of the British Academy
Distinguished professors of philosophy